The Diocese of Añatuya is a Latin Church ecclesiastical territory or diocese of the Catholic Church in Argentina. It is a suffragan diocese in the ecclesiastical province of the metropolitan Archdiocese of Tucumán. The current Bishop of Añatuya is José Luis Corral Peláez.

History
Erected in 1961 by Blessed John XXIII, the diocese is a suffragan of the Archdiocese of Tucumán.

Bishops

Ordinaries
Jorge Gottau, C.Ss.R. (1961–1992)
Antonio Juan Baseotto, C.Ss.R. (1992–2002), appointed Bishop of Argentina, Military
Adolfo Armando Uriona, F.D.P. (2004–2014), appointed Bishop of Villa de la Concepción del Río Cuarto
José Melitón Chávez (2015-2019), appointed Coadjutor Bishop of Concepción
José Luis Corral Peláez, S.V.D. (2019- )

Coadjutor bishops
Antonio Juan Baseotto, C.Ss.R. (1991–1992)
José Luis Corral Peláez, S.V.D. (2019)

External links and references

Anatuya
Anatuya
Anatuya
Anatuya
1961 establishments in Argentina